Pseudopartula is a genus of air-breathing land snails, terrestrial pulmonate gastropod mollusks in the subfamily Camaeninae of the family Camaenidae.

Species
 Pseudopartula arborascens Butot, 1955
 Pseudopartula dohertyi (T. H. Aldrich, 1892)
 Pseudopartula galericulum (Mousson, 1849)
 Pseudopartula goudi Thach, 2021
 Pseudopartula huberi Thach, 2016
 Pseudopartula jomi Dumrongrojwattana & Dharma, 2020
 Pseudopartula juliae Thach, 2021
 Pseudopartula khoai Thach, 2021
 Pseudopartula parsonsi Thach, 2021
 Pseudopartula tuani Thach, 2021

References

 Pfeiffer, L. (1855-1856). Versuch einer Anordnung der Heliceen nach natürlichen Gruppen. Malakozoologische Blätter. 2(3): 112

External links
 Pfeiffer, L. (1855-1856). Versuch einer Anordnung der Heliceen nach natürlichen Gruppen. Malakozoologische Blätter. 2(3): 112
 Pilsbry, H. A. (1906). Note on Dyakia and Pseudopartula. The Nautilus. 20(4): 47

Camaenidae
Gastropod genera